White-Holman House is a historic home located at Raleigh, Wake County, North Carolina.  It was built about 1798, and is a two-story, three bay, frame dwelling with a two-story wing and one-story rear shed addition.  It is sheathed in weatherboard and has a side-hall plan.  It was built by William White (1762–1811), North Carolina Secretary of State, 1798–1811.  The house was moved to its present location in April 1986.

It was listed on the National Register of Historic Places in 1971.  It is located in the Capitol Area Historic District.

References

External links

Historic American Buildings Survey in North Carolina
Houses on the National Register of Historic Places in North Carolina
Houses completed in 1798
Houses in Raleigh, North Carolina
National Register of Historic Places in Raleigh, North Carolina
Historic district contributing properties in North Carolina